Nowruzabad, also rendered as Noruzabad, may refer to any of a number of settlements in Iran:

Ardabil Province

East Azerbaijan Province
Nowruzabad, East Azerbaijan, a village in Meyaneh County

Fars Province
Nowruzabad, Fars, a village in Kazerun County
Nowruzabad, Shiraz, a village in Shiraz County

Gilan Province
Nowruzabad, Gilan, a village in Siahkal County

Kermanshah Province
Nowruzabad, Kermanshah, a village in Kermanshah County
Nowruzabad, Kuzaran, a village in Kermanshah County

Lorestan Province
Nowruzabad, Mirbag-e Shomali, a village in Mirbag-e Shomali Rural District, Central District, Delfan County
Nowruzabad, Nurali, a village in Nurali Rural District, Central District, Delfan County

Markazi Province

Qazvin Province
Nowruzabad, Qazvin, a village in Qazvin County

Razavi Khorasan Province
Nowruzabad, Chenaran, a village in the Central District of Chenaran County
Nowruzabad, Golbajar, a village in Golbajar District, Chenaran County
Nowruzabad, Nishapur, a village Nishapur County
Nowruzabad, Sarakhs, a village Sarakhs County

West Azerbaijan Province
Nowruzabad, West Azerbaijan, a village in Shahin Dezh County

Zanjan Province
Nowruzabad, Zanjan, a village in Zanjan County

See also
Nowrozabad, in India